Anolis marmoratus, commonly known as the leopard anole, Guadeloupe anole, or Guadeloupean anole, is a species of anole that is endemic to the islands of Guadeloupe, in the Caribbean Lesser Antilles.

Five former subspecies have been elevated to species status: A. ferreus, A. terraealtae, A.kahouannensis, A.chrysops, and A.desiradei.

Of the currently accepted leopard anole subspecies, five live on the island of Basse-Terre and two on the island of Grande-Terre. The validity of these subspecies has been questioned as there is extensive intergradation between them and the species shows extreme variability in its appearance; both between regions and individually in the same region. This has possibly been enhanced by habitats changes by humans (allowing populations to easier come into contact with each other) and translocations of individuals. Most leopard anoles do not clearly match the typically recognized subspecies. Genetic studies confirm that strong assortative mating between the different populations does not exist, despite their distinct differences in appearance and them having separated about 650,000 years ago (confidence interval starting at 351,000 years).

List of current subspecies 
The following is a table showing the description and geographical distribution of all the currently accepted subspecies of Anolis marmoratus.

References

External links

Anolis marmoratus at the Encyclopedia of Life
Anolis marmoratus at the Reptile Database

Anoles
Lizards of the Caribbean
Endemic fauna of Guadeloupe
Reptiles of Guadeloupe
Reptiles described in 1837
Taxa named by André Marie Constant Duméril
Taxa named by Gabriel Bibron